Newburgh Heights is a village in Cuyahoga County, Ohio, United States. The population was 2,167 at the 2010 census.

Geography
Newburgh Heights is surrounded on three sides (west, north and east) by Washington Park Blvd, north of Harvard Avenue, and west of the Willow Freeway (I-77) at  (41.450, -81.660).

Demographics

As of the 2000 census, the center of population in Cuyahoga County was located in Newburgh Heights, near East 26th Street.

96.0% spoke English, 3.4% Polish, and 0.7% Spanish.

2010 census
As of the census of 2010, there were 2,167 people, 958 households, and 536 families residing in the village. The racial makeup of the village was 79.1% White, 14.9% African American, 0.1% Native American, 0.3% Asian, 2.3% from other races, and 3.2% from two or more races. Hispanic or Latino of any race were 5.4% of the population.

There were 958 households, of which 30.7% had children under the age of 18 living with them, 28.7% were married couples living together, 19.1% had a female householder with no husband present, 8.1% had a male householder with no wife present, and 44.1% were non-families. 37.4% of all households were made up of individuals, and 10.7% had someone living alone who was 65 years of age or older. The average household size was 2.26 and the average family size was 2.96.

The median age in the village was 37.2 years. 24.8% of residents were under the age of 18; 8.7% were between the ages of 18 and 24; 25.5% were from 25 to 44; 28.4% were from 45 to 64; and 12.6% were 65 years of age or older. The gender makeup of the village was 51.0% male and 49.0% female.

2000 census
As of the census of 2000, there were 2,389 people, 1,052 households, and 621 families residing in the village. The population density was 4,104.3 people per square mile (1,590.3/km). There were 1,157 housing units at an average density of 1,987.7 per square mile (770.2/km). The racial makeup of the village was 94.47% White, 3.14% African American, 0.21% Native American, 0.13% Asian, 0.54% from other races, and 1.51% from two or more races. Hispanic or Latino of any race were 2.47% of the population.

There were 1,052 households, out of which 25.4% had children under the age of 18 living with them, 36.8% were married couples living together, 17.4% had a female householder with no husband present, and 40.9% were non-families. 33.9% of all households were made up of individuals, and 11.8% had someone living alone who was 65 years of age or older. The average household size was 2.27 and the average family size was 2.91.

In the village, the population was spread out, with 21.6% under the age of 18, 8.9% from 18 to 24, 33.6% from 25 to 44, 22.4% from 45 to 64, and 13.5% who were 65 years of age or older. The median age was 37 years. For every 100 females there were 93.0 males. For every 100 females age 18 and over, there were 91.4 males.

The median income for a household in the village was $37,409, and the median income for a family was $42,131. Males had a median income of $37,650 versus $24,969 for females. The per capita income for the village was $18,636. About 9.2% of families and 12.0% of the population were below the poverty line, including 16.9% of those under age 18 and 5.3% of those age 65 or over.

Traffic enforcement
Newburgh Heights is a nationally-known  leader in modern technology, employing traffic cameras along Interstate 77 that runs through it. In addition, traffic cameras are employed in the stretch of Harvard Avenue that leads to the I-77 on ramp. The penalties range from $150.00 to $300.00.

Former mayor Trevor Elkins said the system is safer than when officers pull over speeding drivers. "The people who are speeding are not victims," Elkins said. "They were breaking the law, and they got caught." 

Mayor Elkins has stated publicly that he defends the use of the cameras and admits they generate revenue, and said in 2016, "do I recognize that they generate revenue? Absolutely. Do I apologize for that? No."

References

External links

Villages in Cuyahoga County, Ohio
Villages in Ohio